The Schwarzlose Model 1898 was a full-size, locked-breech, rotary-bolt, semi-automatic pistol invented by Prussian firearm designer Andreas Wilhelm Schwarzlose.  It was chambered for cartridges such as the 7.65×25mm Borchardt and 7.63×25mm Mauser.

Most pistols used a six-shot detachable magazine, but a few were built with a larger frame for an eight-shot magazine. The rear sight was vertically adjustable, and the firing pin served as a cocking indicator by protruding to the rear. The Schwarzlose design was advanced for its time, but not widely adopted with less than 500 pieces being manufactured.

Small lots were sold to the Boers during the Boer War. Another lot was sold to members of the Russian Social-Democratic Party who were plotting insurrection, but were confiscated at the Russian border and issued to the Imperial Russian Frontier Guards.

Users

See also
Schwarzlose Model 1908

References

External links
Gunwriters' Questions and Answers, P. T. Kekkonen.  #17, April 2002. 
Forgotten Weapons - Schwarzlose 1898 Semiauto Pistol

19th-century semi-automatic pistols
Semi-automatic pistols of Germany
7.65mm firearms
7.63×25mm Mauser firearms